Men, Women & Dogs is an American television sitcom starring Bill Bellamy. The series premiered October 14, 2001 on The WB.

Plot
The series centered on four guys who meet every day with their dogs in a Los Angeles dog park. Among those shown were Jeremiah, a chef, Clay, Jermiah's best friend, Eric, a surfer, and Royce, who didn't have a dog but thought the dog park was a good place to meet girls.

Cast
 Bill Bellamy as Jeremiah 
 Danny Pino as Clay
 Niklaus Lange as Eric 
 Mike Damus as Royce
 Heather Stephens as Michelle
 Leigh Evans as Jackie
 Brian Suder as Thomas
 Tracey Cherelle Jones as Nina

Episodes

Reception
Ken Tucker of Entertainment Weekly described the series as the "most insultingly moronic, sniggering sitcom of the year".

References

External links

2000s American sitcoms
2001 American television series debuts
2001 American television series endings
English-language television shows
The WB original programming
Television series by CBS Studios
Television shows set in Los Angeles